Plantagenet County may refer to places in Australia:
 Plantagenet County, Western Australia
 Plantagenet County, Queensland